Fred C. Caruso is an American film producer known for his work on such films as Network and Blue Velvet.

His contributions as a producer for the film version of The Bonfire of the Vanities with director Brian De Palma were detailed in Julie Salamon's 1991 non-fiction book The Devil's Candy.

Selected filmography
He was a producer in all films unless otherwise noted.

Film

Production manager

As an actor

Thanks

Television

Production manager

References

External links

American film producers
Living people
Year of birth missing (living people)
Unit production managers